The Marsch in E-flat major, WAB 116, is a military march composed by Anton Bruckner in 1865.

History 
Bruckner composed this for him unique work on 12 August 1865 during his stay in Linz, at the time when he was composing his first symphony,

However, it is not known whether it ever was performed by this military band. In the Bruckner-Handbuch is only noted that the march was presumably performed in Linz in 1865.

Bruckner's manuscript is stored in the Österreichische Nationalbibliothek. It was first edited in Band III/2, pp. 226–233 of the Göllerich/Auer biography.

Music 

The work, a march of 32-bar and a trio of 32 bars too, is scored in E-flat major for military band (piccolo, 5 clarinets, 2 flugelhorns, 7 trumpets, 3 horns, 2 trombones, 3 euphoniums, 2 tubas, drums and bass drum).

In the hunting scherzo [of Symphony No. 4], where the dense and brilliant brass scoring recalls Bruckner's 1865 infantry march in E flat, WAB 116 ...

Apollo-Marsch 
Another military march, the Apollo-Marsch, was for many years attributed to Bruckner and put as WAB 115 by Grasberger. This march was even performed on 14 September 1924, to celebrate the 100th anniversary of Bruckner's birth.

It is now definite that the Apollo-Marsch was composed in 1857 as Mazzuchelli-Marsch for the Austria-Hungary Infantry-regiment No. 10 by Béla Kéler, another Kitzler's student, while Bruckner copied the instrumentation and form exactly, but not the music, for his own Marsch in E-flat major.

Discography 
There are four recordings of Bruckner's Military march:
Désiré Dondeyne, La Musique des Gardiens de la Paix de la Préfecture de Police de Paris, Marches militaires allemandes. Anthologie de la Musique d'Harmonie – LP:Societé d'études et de Réalisations Publicitaires (SERP) MC 7.033, 1976. A digitalization of the march can be heard on John Berky's website.
Ryusuke Numajiri, Osaka Municipal Symphonic Band, Harmoniemusik of the Great Composers – CD: Exton OVCL-00113, 2002
Clark Rundell, Royal Northern College of Music Wind Orchestra, Experiments on a March – CD: Chandos CHAN 10367, 2005
Major Arjan Tien, Marine Band of the Royal Netherlands Navy, Worthweill Originals – CD: Channel Classics, CCS 4219, 2018

References

Sources 
 August Göllerich, Anton Bruckner. Ein Lebens- und Schaffens-Bild, c. 1922 – posthumous edited by Max Auer by G. Bosse, Regensburg, 1932
 Uwe Harten, Anton Bruckner. Ein Handbuch, Salzburg, 1996. .
 Anton Bruckner – Sämtliche Werke, Band XII/8: Marsch in Es-Dur für Blasorchester (1865), Musikwissenschaftlicher Verlag der Internationalen Bruckner-Gesellschaft, Rüdiger Bornhöft (Editor), Vienna, 1996
 Cornelis van Zwol, Anton Bruckner 1824–1896 – Leven en werken, uitg. Thoth, Bussum, Netherlands, 2012. 
 Crawford Howie, Anton Bruckner - A documentary biography, online revised edition

External links 
 
Score of the March, WAB 116 by Martin Tousignant
 Marsch Es-Dur, WAB 116 Critical discography by Hans Roelofs 
 A performance of Bruckner's Military march by the United States Coast Guard Band can be heard on John Berky's website: March in E Flat, October 2013
 Another performance by the Tokyo Wind Sinfonica can be heard on YouTube: Marsch in Es-Dur (WAB 116), January 2015
 A performance of Kéler's Mazzuchelli-Marsch by the Militärmusik of Salzburg can be heard on YouTube: Mazzuchelli-Marsch

Compositions by Anton Bruckner
1865 compositions
Compositions in E-flat major
Austrian military marches